Mitoquinone mesylate (MitoQ) is a synthetic analogue of coenzyme Q10 which has antioxidant effects. It was first developed in New Zealand in the late 1990s. It has significantly improved bioavailability and improved mitochondrial penetration compared to coenzyme Q10, and has shown potential in a number of medical indications, being widely sold as a dietary supplement.

A 2014 review found insufficient evidence for the use of mitoquinone mesylate in Parkinson's disease and other movement disorders.

See also 
 Idebenone
 Nicotinamide mononucleotide
 Pyrroloquinoline quinone

References 

Antioxidants
1,4-Benzoquinones